C. Frank Miller (July 3, 1933 - May 22, 2020) was a Republican state representative for the 12th district in the Kansas House of Representatives from 2001 to 2006. He was born in Barranquilla, Colombia to Presbyterian missionaries Ruth and Bill Miller. Miller's home was donated by his heirs to the HSH (Home Sweet Home) Homeless Ministry Project, Inc. and is now the Miller House for Veterans.

References 

Republican Party members of the Kansas House of Representatives
21st-century American politicians
People from Barranquilla
1933 births
2020 deaths